Solimar Beach is within western Ventura city, in Ventura County, California. It is a small Southern California beach.

Location
Solimar Beach is located approximately one mile north of Emma Wood State Beach.

Solimar beach is the stretch of sand and ocean that lines the ocean front housing and extends southeast towards the city of Ventura.

"Soli" breaks well with a 3'+ southerly swell — conditions varying on the shape of the sandbar.

External links
Emma Wood State Beach website - adjacent park

Beaches of Southern California
Ventura, California
Parks in Ventura County, California
Beaches of Ventura County, California
Populated coastal places in California